Grand Isle (French: Grande Île) is a town in Aroostook County, Maine, United States. The population was 366 at the 2020 census. The village of Grand Isle is in the northwest part of the town.

Etymology
Grand Isle takes its name from an island located in the Saint John River near the town center.

Geography

Demographics

2010 census

As of the census of 2010, there were 467 people, 215 households, and 135 families living in the town. The racial makeup of the town was 98.5% White, 0.4% African American, 0.4% Native American, and 0.6% from two or more races.

There were 215 households, of which 20.5% had children under the age of 18 living with them, 52.1% were married couples living together, 5.1% had a female householder with no husband present, 5.6% had a male householder with no wife present, and 37.2% were non-families. 30.2% of all households were made up of individuals, and 13% had someone living alone who was 65 years of age or older. The average household size was 2.15 and the average family size was 2.66.

The median age in the town was 49.3 years. 16.9% of residents were under the age of 18; 4.5% were between the ages of 18 and 24; 19.1% were from 25 to 44; 33.8% were from 45 to 64; and 25.7% were 65 years of age or older. The gender makeup of the town was 51.2% male and 48.8% female.

2000 census

As of the census of 2000, there were 518 people, 218 households, and 161 families living in the town.  The population density was 15.1 people per square mile (5.8/km2).  There were 268 housing units at an average density of 7.8 per square mile (3.0/km2).  The racial makeup of the town was 98.84% White, 0.39% Native American, 0.19% Asian, and 0.58% from two or more races. Hispanic or Latino of any race were 0.39% of the population. Grande Isle is one of several American communities in Northern Maine with a French-speaking majority, with over 75% of the households reporting in 2000 that French is spoken at home.

There were 218 households, out of which 23.4% had children under the age of 18 living with them, 63.3% were married couples living together, 6.0% had a female householder with no husband present, and 25.7% were non-families. 22.0% of all households were made up of individuals, and 11.5% had someone living alone who was 65 years of age or older.  The average household size was 2.38 and the average family size was 2.72.

In the town, the population was spread out, with 20.8% under the age of 18, 4.6% from 18 to 24, 17.6% from 25 to 44, 37.6% from 45 to 64, and 19.3% who were 65 years of age or older.  The median age was 49 years. For every 100 females, there were 95.5 males.  For every 100 females age 18 and over, there were 96.2 males.

The median income for a household in the town was $28,125, and the median income for a family was $34,875. Males had a median income of $40,000 versus $30,938 for females. The per capita income for the town was $13,346.  About 12.7% of families and 17.4% of the population were below the poverty line, including 32.1% of those under age 18 and 9.2% of those age 65 or over.

Notable people

 Emilien Levesque (1922–2003), congressman from Maine; born in Grand Isle

References

Towns in Aroostook County, Maine
Towns in Maine